Culp is a surname. Notable people bearing it include:

 Arlie F. Culp (born 1926), American politician
 Benny Culp (1914–2000), American baseball player
 Connie Culp (born 1963), the first United States recipient of a face transplant
 Curley Culp (born 1963), American football player
 Dennis Culp  (born 1970), American trombonist, singer, and songwriter
 Faye B. Culp (born 1939), American politician
 Jonathan Culp (born 1971), Canadian underground filmmaker
 Julia Culp (1880–1970), Dutch mezzo-soprano
 Oveta Culp Hobby (1905–1995), U.S. public official and newspaper publisher
 Ray Culp (born 1941), American baseball player
 Robert Culp (1930–2010), American actor
 Steven Culp  (born 1955), American actor

See also 
 Culp, Alberta
 Culp Creek
 Kulp (surname)